Bincknoll Dip Woods is a woodland in Wiltshire, England.

Two blocks within the site, an area of 5.7 hectare in total, have been notified as a biological Site of Special Scientific Interest, notification originally taking place in 1971.

Sources
 Natural England citation sheet for the site (accessed 22 March 2022)

External links
 Natural England website (SSSI information)

Sites of Special Scientific Interest in Wiltshire
Sites of Special Scientific Interest notified in 1971